The St. Joseph Apache Mission Church is a historic church at 626 Mission Trail in Mescalero, New Mexico, United States.  It was added to the National Register of Historic Places in 2005.

The church was built upon the stone floor of a prehistoric Jornada Mogollon-culture ruin, estimated to date from 200 to 1400 A.D.

It was designed in Late Late Gothic Revival style by Philadelphia architect William C. Stanton.

See also

National Register of Historic Places listings in Otero County, New Mexico

References

External links

Buildings and structures in Otero County, New Mexico
Roman Catholic churches in New Mexico
Churches on the National Register of Historic Places in New Mexico
Roman Catholic churches completed in 1939
National Register of Historic Places in Otero County, New Mexico
20th-century Roman Catholic church buildings in the United States